Song in My Head is the tenth release and sixth studio album of Colorado-based jam band The String Cheese Incident. Released in April 2014.

Track listing

External links
http://www.livecheese.com/music/0,10733/The-String-Cheese-Incident-mp3-flac-download-Song-In-My-Head.html

The String Cheese Incident albums
2014 albums